Lance Dwight Alworth (born August 3, 1940), nicknamed “Bambi”, is an American former professional football player who was a wide receiver for the San Diego Chargers of the American Football League (AFL) and National Football League (NFL) and Dallas Cowboys of the NFL. Often considered one of the greatest wide receivers of all time, he played for 11 seasons, from 1962 through 1972, and was elected to the Pro Football Hall of Fame in 1978. He was the first player inducted whose playing career was principally in the AFL. Alworth is also a member of the College Football Hall of Fame.

Early life
Born in Houston, Texas, Alworth was raised in Hog Chain, Mississippi. He played football at Brookhaven High School before attending the University of Arkansas. While in high school, he earned 15 letters. Alworth's sister Ann was fast enough in the 50- and 75-yard dashes in track to be invited to the Olympic Games trials, though she declined the invitation.  After high school, Alworth was offered baseball contracts by the New York Yankees and the Pittsburgh Pirates.

College career
At Arkansas, the six-foot (1.83 m),  Alworth was a flanker who led all colleges in punt return yardage in 1960 and 1961. Alworth was a three-time Academic All-American, graduating with a degree in marketing as a pre-law student. In 1962, Alworth was on multiple All-American teams: Look magazine, Associated Press, United Press International and Coaches. Alworth was a key member of Arkansas teams that won, or shared, three consecutive Southwest Conference championships between 1959 and 1961, winning 25 games in that time span. The 1959 team won the 1960 Gator Bowl over Georgia Tech. Alworth was the MVP of the 1961 Cotton Bowl Classic, even though Arkansas lost the game, after he returned a punt for a touchdown. It would be the last time a punt was returned for a touchdown in the Cotton Bowl for fifty-one years until another Razorback, Joe Adams, returned a punt for a score in the 2012 Cotton Bowl Classic. 
He is a member of the Pi Kappa Alpha fraternity. Alworth is a member of the University of Arkansas Hall of Honor and the Arkansas Sports Hall of Fame; he was named to the University of Arkansas' 1960's All-Decade Team, and the school's All-Century Team in 1994.

Professional career

San Diego Chargers
Alworth was chosen in the first round (eighth overall) of the 1962 NFL draft by the San Francisco 49ers. The American Football League's Oakland Raiders selected him with their first pick (ninth overall) in the second round of the 1962 AFL Draft, and then traded his rights to the San Diego Chargers in return for halfback Bo Roberson, quarterback Hunter Enis, and offensive tackle Gene Selawski. Alworth opted to sign with the Chargers instead of the 49ers. The Chargers kept Alworth at flanker. His slender build, speed, grace, and leaping ability earned him the nickname "Bambi."

In his rookie season, Alworth had just 10 receptions in 4 games (though three were for touchdowns). His second year was a different story, as he set franchise records in receptions (61), yards (1,205), and touchdowns (11), earning the UPI's AFL Most Valuable Player award. He had 4 receptions for 77 yards, including a 48-yard touchdown, in San Diego's AFL championship win over the Boston Patriots. He was selected as an AFL Western Division All-Star for the first of seven consecutive seasons, as well as an AFL All-League flanker for the first of six seasons, selected by his peers from 1963 to 1966, and by newspaper wire services from 1967 to 1968.

Over the next six seasons (1964–1969), Alworth broke his own franchise receiving records several times, and also led the league in receptions, receiving yards, receiving touchdowns, and total touchdowns three times each. He shattered the record for most consecutive seasons with over 1,000 receiving yards (7, previously 3, now held by Jerry Rice with 11), and was the first player with back-to-back seasons averaging 100+ receiving yards per game, both of which led the league. The 1966 season was particularly noteworthy, because he led the league in five categories. He still shares the record for the most regular-season games with 200+ yards receiving (5), and had a franchise-record streak of 96 consecutive games with a reception.

Alworth formed a formidable tandem with Chargers quarterback John Hadl, and is considered by many to be the best wide receiver in all professional football during the 1960s. He is a member of the AFL All-Time Team. He was the first of only a few American Football League stars to be featured on the cover of Sports Illustrated, which like other media of the 1960s, showed a distinct bias for the NFL. Sports Illustrated even went so far as to declare Alworth the "Top Pro Receiver" in December 1965, this at a time when many claimed the AFL had inferior players. Alworth's productivity sharply declined in 1970 (35 catches for 608 yards), and he was traded to Dallas at the end of the season. See below for his numerous franchise records with the Chargers.

Dallas Cowboys
On May 19, 1971, Alworth was traded to the Dallas Cowboys, for his final two seasons. In exchange, the Chargers received Tony Liscio, Pettis Norman, and Ron East.

In Super Bowl VI following the 1971 season, he scored the game's first touchdown, which was a 7-yard touchdown pass from Roger Staubach in the Cowboys' 24-3 victory over the Miami Dolphins. Alworth would later call the two receptions he made in Super Bowl VI (one that converted a third and long and the other for the touchdown) the two most important catches of his career.

NFL career statistics

Legacy
Alworth finished his 11 AFL/NFL seasons with 543 receptions for 10,266 yards.  He also rushed for 129 yards, returned 29 punts for 309 yards, gained 216 yards on 10 kickoff returns, and scored 87 touchdowns (85 receiving and 2 rushing).

In 1972, he was inducted to the San Diego Hall of Champions. In 1977, he was inducted in the Chargers Hall of Fame. In 1978, he became the first San Diego Charger and the first player who had played in the AFL to be inducted into the Pro Football Hall of Fame.  He chose to be presented at the Canton, Ohio ceremony by Oakland Raiders owner Al Davis, his former position coach at San Diego, who had much to do with the success of the AFL.

Alworth's number 19 was retired by the Chargers in 2005. In 1970, he was selected as a member of the AFL All-Time Team, and in 1994, he was named to the NFL 75th Anniversary All-Time Team, the only player to be named to both teams.

In 1979, he was inducted into the Arkansas Sports Hall of Fame. In 1988, he was inducted into the Mississippi Sports Hall of Fame.

In 1999, he was ranked number 31 on The Sporting News' list of the 100 Greatest Football Players, making him the highest-ranking Charger and the highest-ranking player to have spent more than one season in the AFL.

In 2014, he was inducted into the Southwest Conference Hall of Fame.

NFL records
 Most games with 200+ receiving yards: 5 (tied with Calvin Johnson)
 Fastest to 5,000 career receiving yards (52 games) 
 Fastest to 6,000 career receiving yards (62 games)
 Fastest to 7,000 career receiving yards (tied with Julio Jones (72 games) 
 Fastest to 8,000 career receiving yards (83 games) 
 Most receiving yards in first 50 games: 4,785 
 Most receiving yards in first 75 games: 7,532
 Most touchdown receptions, 70+ yards, career: 12
 Most consecutive seasons, 11+ TD receptions: 4 (1963–1966; tied with Marvin Harrison, 1999–2002; Art Powell, 1963–1966)
 Most consecutive seasons, 12+ TD receptions: 3, (1964–1966; tied with Jerry Rice, 1989–1991 and 1993–1995; Marvin Harrison, 1999–2001 and 2004–2006; Terrell Owens, 2000–2002; Cris Carter, 1997–1999)
 Most consecutive seasons, 13+ TD receptions: 3, (1964–1966; tied with Jerry Rice, 1989–1991 and 1993–1995; Terrell Owens, 2000–2002)

Chargers franchise records
 Receiving yards, season: 1,602 (1965)
 Receiving touchdowns, season: 14 (1965; tied with Tony Martin)
 Yards per reception, season: 23.2 (1965)
 Yards per reception, career (min. 50 receptions): 19.4
 Yards per game, season: 114.4 (1965)
 Yards per game, career: 86.3
 Seasons with 1000+ receiving yards: 7 (1963–1969)
 Consecutive seasons with 1000+ receiving yards: 7 (1963–1969)
 Seasons with 10+ receiving TDs: 5
 Consecutive games with a reception: 96 (September 7, 1962 – December 14, 1969)
 Games with 100+ receiving yards, career: 41
 Games with 100+ receiving yards, season: 9
 Games with 200+ receiving yards: 5 (only 3 other such games in franchise history)
 Games with 100+ receiving yards, and 1+ TDs: 36

Personal life
Alworth and his wife, Laura, whom he married in 1997, live in San Diego. He has six children. He founded All Aboard Mini Storage, with facilities throughout California. His first wife, the former Betty Jeanne Allen, later married Arkansas Governor Jim Guy Tucker. Alworth's grandson, Brian Driscoll, is an offensive lineman at University of California, Berkeley.

See also
 List of NCAA major college yearly punt and kickoff return leaders
List of American Football League players

References

External links
 
 
 

1940 births
Living people
Arkansas Razorbacks football players
American Football League All-Time Team
American Football League All-Star players
American Football League Most Valuable Players
American Football League players
American football wide receivers
College Football Hall of Fame inductees
Dallas Cowboys players
National Football League players with retired numbers
People from Lincoln County, Mississippi
Players of American football from Mississippi
Pro Football Hall of Fame inductees
San Diego Chargers players
Players of American football from Houston
10,000 receiving yards club